Alexandra Mavrokordatou (1605–1684) was a famous Greek intellectual and salonist. She was also known as Loxandra Scarlatou.

She was the daughter of Scarlatos Beglitzi. A member of the Mavrokordatoi, one of the most famous Phanariote families, she was raised in Constantinople, where she was given a good education. She married the rich Greek silk merchant Nikolaos Mavrokordatos (1599-1649).

After two unhappy marriages, she became the first Greek woman start a salon in the Ottoman Empire.  Christian Greeks were not obliged to obey the Islamic laws of restriction in contacts between the sexes, which made a literary salon possible.  Her example was soon followed by other Greek women, and she became quite influential in society as the centre of political discussions.  

In 1683, her son Alexander Mavrocordatos participated in the Battle of Vienna and was blamed for the Ottoman loss to Austria, and Alexandra was accused by the Turks of having encouraged his alleged treason because of her wish to liberate Greece from Ottoman rule. 

She was arrested and put in jail, where she died at the age of 79 in 1684.

References

1605 births
1684 deaths
17th-century Greek people
17th-century Greek women
17th-century Greek politicians 
Alexandra
Ottoman culture
Ottoman Athens
Salon-holders from the Ottoman Empire
Constantinopolitan Greeks